Krzysztof T. Konecki is a full professor and Vice Dean for Research at the Faculty of Economics and Sociology, University of Łódź. He is the editor-in-chief of Qualitative Sociology Review, and he holds the position of President of the Polish Sociological Association. He is also a member of the Sociology Committee of Polish Academy of Science. 
His interests lie in qualitative sociology, sociology of interaction, symbolic interactionism, sociology of body, methodology of social sciences, visual sociology, communication and intercultural management, organizational culture and management, and contemplative sociology. He is an author of many books and articles.

References 

Year of birth missing (living people)
Living people
Polish sociologists
Academic staff of the University of Łódź